Soti may refer to:

People
 Anaika Soti, Indian actress and model
 Jozef Soti (born 1972), Serbian sprint canoer
 Soti Triantafyllou (born 1957), Greek author
 Thea Soti (born 1989), Serbian musician

Places
 Nangal Soti, India

Other
 Soti incident